Ernest Thomas (Ernie) Page  (18 February 1935 – 20 May 2018) was an Australian politician, who served nine terms as Mayor of Waverley and was a Labor Party member of the New South Wales Legislative Assembly from 1981 to 2003. Page was Minister for Local Government in the first government of Bob Carr from 1995 to 1999.

Early life and career
Page was educated at St Joseph's College, Hunters Hill and the University of New South Wales, and served two years as a conscript in the army in 1954–55. He worked as an engineer in the electricity industry before entering state politics, and was an active member of both the Labor Party and the trade union movement. Page was a councillor for the Waverley Municipal Council from 1962 to 1987, nine of those years as mayor.

Parliament of New South Wales
Page nominated for Labor preselection for the local seat of Waverley at the 1981 state election after the retirement of Wran government minister Syd Einfeld, and was successful. He easily defeated the Liberal candidate on election day, and was re-elected twice more, before switching to the seat of Coogee when Waverley was abolished in 1991. He served another three terms as the member for Coogee. Page also served as Minister for Local Government in the first Carr government from 1995 to 1999, but was not reappointed to the ministry after the 1999 state election. Page retired at the 2003 election.

Later life
In the Queen's Birthday 2006 Honours List, Page was awarded the Medal of the Order of Australia for service to the New South Wales Parliament and to local government.

On 22 May 2018, the Deputy Speaker Thomas George informed the Legislative Assembly that Page had died on 20 May.

References

 

1935 births
2018 deaths
Members of the New South Wales Legislative Assembly
Australian Labor Party members of the Parliament of New South Wales
Mayors of Waverley, New South Wales
People educated at St Joseph's College, Hunters Hill
University of New South Wales alumni
Recipients of the Medal of the Order of Australia
21st-century Australian politicians